Orthogonal array testing is a black box testing technique that is a systematic,  statistical way of software testing. It is used when the number of inputs to the system is relatively small, but too large to allow for exhaustive testing of every possible input to the systems. It is particularly effective in finding errors associated with faulty logic within computer software systems. Orthogonal arrays can be applied in user interface testing, system testing, regression testing, configuration testing and performance testing.
The permutations of factor levels comprising a single treatment are so chosen that their responses are uncorrelated and therefore each treatment gives a unique piece of information. The net effects of organizing the experiment in such treatments is that the same piece of information is gathered in the minimum number of experiments.

Background

Orthogonal vector 
Orthogonal vectors exhibit orthogonality. Orthogonal vectors exhibit the following properties:
 Each of the vectors conveys information different from that of any other vector in the sequence, i.e., each vector conveys unique information therefore avoiding redundancy.
 On a linear addition, the signals may be separated easily.
 Each of the vectors is statistically independent of the others, i.e., the correlation between them is nil.
 When linearly added, the resultant is the arithmetic sum of the individual components.

Technique

Benefits
 Testing cycle time is reduced and analysis is simpler.
 Test cases are balanced, so it's straightforward to isolate defects and assess performance.  This provides a significant cost savings over pair-wise testing.

References

External links 
 
 
 
 
 

Survival analysis
Design of experiments